Streptomyces staurosporininus is a bacterium species from the genus of Streptomyces which has been isolated from hay meadow soil from the Cockle Park Experimental Farm in Northumberland in the United Kingdom. Streptomyces staurosporininus produces the antibiotic, staurosporine.

See also 
 List of Streptomyces species

References

Further reading

External links
Type strain of Streptomyces staurosporininus at BacDive -  the Bacterial Diversity Metadatabase	

staurosporininus
Bacteria described in 2012